Mick Dowdle (born 3 July 1947) is  a former Australian rules footballer who played with North Melbourne in the Victorian Football League (VFL). 	

Dowdle played in Jerilderie's 1963 Coreen & District Football League premiership and also won the 1963 Coreen & DFL best and fairest award, the Archie Dennis Medal and is the youngest ever winner of this award, as a 16 year old.

Dowdle made his senior VFL debut against Fitzoy in round 17, in August 1964 at the Arden Street Oval, North Melbourne, as a 17 year old.

Notes

External links 		
		
		
		
		
		
		
Living people		
1947 births		
		
Australian rules footballers from New South Wales
North Melbourne Football Club players